Apalimnodes granulatus is a species of beetle in the family Cerambycidae, and the only species in the genus Apalimnodes. It was described by Franz in 1966.

References

Ancylonotini
Beetles described in 1966
Monotypic Cerambycidae genera